Meditavolutions is the fourth album by The Iceburn Collective, released on April 9, 1996 through Revelation Records.

Track listing

Personnel 
The Iceburn Collective
Gentry Densley – guitar, sitar, production, engineering
James Holder – guitar
Greg Nielsen – tenor saxophone
Daniel Day – drums
Doug Wright – bass guitar
Production and additional personnel
Randy Herbert – percussion
Tony Korologos – production, engineering, recording

References

External links 
 

1996 albums
Iceburn albums
Revelation Records albums